Barry Weeks, is a record producer, songwriter and mixer.  As a producer and songwriter he has garnered multiple Grammy and Dove award nominations and multiple BMI awards as well as several #1s and multiple top 10 songs.  Barry's songs have been licensed for use on ESPN, NBC, CBS and many other networks.  Barry has worked with many well known artists such as Kelly Clarkson, Backstreet Boys, Francesca Battistelli, and Dave Barnes.

Biography
Barry was born in Alexandria, Virginia. He attended Pimmit Hills Elementary School and George C. Marshall High School in Falls Church, Virginia. He went on to attend National Business College in Roanoke, Virginia.  In 1990 his music career began to help form the Christian music trio "Holy Wind". They released three records as well as performed at multiple Amway conventions across the country. He started his producing and recording career in 1991 forming Duke Recording studio in Vinton, Virginia.  Barry produced a record for the Multi Grammy and Dove award-winning group The Imperials in 1995. One year later he joined the group as a vocalist and toured with them until 1999. He later signed as a writer with Brentwood Benson Music Publishing in 2004 until 2015. He is currently a staff writer at Radiate Music Publishing in Franklin, TN.

He has had his songs recorded by Mandisa, Kutless, VERIDIA, The Booth Brothers, and many others.

Credits
Mandisa, "The Overcomer" – Greatest Hits, 2020, composer
7eventh Time Down, BranD New Day, 2019, Vocal Producer
Francesca Battistelli, Own It, 2018, producer
Ten Days In the Valley, ABC TV Show, Trailer, 2017, writer, producer
Ghost In The Shell, Movie Trailer, 2017, writer, producer
Ping Pong Trick Shots 3, Dude Perfect, Background Music, 2017, writer, producer
Mandisa, The Ultimate Playlist, 2016, composer
Kutless, Surrender, 2015, composer, engineer
Kutless, Glory, 2014, Editing, Vocal Engineer
Francesca Battistelli, If We're Honest, 2014, Vocal Editing
VERIDIA, Inseparable, 2014, Additional Production, composer, producer, Programming
The Booth Brothers, The Best of The Booth Brothers, 2014, composer
Jason Crabb, Love Is Stronger, 2013, composer
Sidewalk Prophets, Merry Christmas to You, 2013, Vocal Engineer, Vocal Producer
Karyn Williams, Only You, 2013, producer, Mixing, Overdubs, Programming, Background Vocals
Mandisa, Overcomer, 2013, composer
Jaci Velasquez, Diamond, 2013, composer
The Booth Brothers, Greatest Hits Live, 2012, composer
The Crabb Family, Together Again, 2012, composer
Wes Hampton, A Man Like Me, 2011, composer
Rachel Lampa, All We Need, 2011, composer
Hawk Nelson, Crazy Love, 2011, Vocal Engineer, Vocal Producer
Francesca Battistelli, Hundred More Years, 2011, Vocal Engineer, Vocal Producer
Pocket Full of Rocks, Let It Rain: The Best of Pocket Full of Rocks, 2011, Composer
The Martins, New Day, 2011, composer
Ronnie Freeman, Perfect Love, 2011, engineer, Mixing
WOW Christmas 2011, 2011, Vocals
Stellar Kart, Everything Is Different Now, 2010, Vocal Engineer, Additional Production
Jeff Easter, Expecting Good Things, 2010, composer
PureNRG, Graduation: The Best of PureNRG, 2010, Composer
Me In Motion, Me in Motion, 2010, Recorder
Pocket Full of Rocks, More Than Noise, 2010, composer
Gold City, Somebody's Coming, 2010, composer
The Hoppers, Something's Happening, 2010, composer
Talley Trio, Stories & Songs, 2010, composer
Great Worship Songs / Great Worship Songs Praise Band, The Acoustic Set, 2010, producer, arranger, composer
Sandi Patty, The Edge of the Divine, 2010, composer
All Star United, The Good Album, 2010, Vocal Engineer, Vocal Editing
Starfield, The Saving One, 2010, Vocal Producer
Sidewalk Prophets, These Simple Truths, 2010, Vocal Producer, Vocal Recording, Vocals
33 Miles, Today, 2010, composer
Stellar Kart, Top 10, 2010, engineer, producer, Vocals
WOW Hits 2011, 2010, composer
Phillips, Fearless, 2009, composer
Robert Pierre, Identity, 2009, composer
Stellar Kart, Life Is Good: The Best of Stellar Kart, 2009, Engineer, Producer, Vocals
Katie Jordan, Mighty River, 2009, Composer
Avalon, Reborn, 2009, producer, Mixing, composer
Sarah Reeves, Sweet Sweet Sound, 2009, Vocal Engineer, Vocal Producer, Audio Production
Pure NRG, The Real Thing, 2009, composer
Jump5, The Ultimate Collection, 2009, composer
PureNRG, reNRGized, 2009, composer
Natalie Grant, Awaken/Deeper Life, 2009, composer
Kathleen Carnali, Dangerous Prayer, 2008, producer, Mixing, Programming, Vocal Programming
Remedy Drive, Daylight Is Coming, 2008, Vocal Engineer, Vocal Producer, engineer
Stellar Kart, Expect the Impossible, 2008, producer, Audio Engineer, Audio Production, Vocal Engineer
Kathy Peak, God Will Make a Way, 2008, composer
Kathy Peak, God and a Girl, 2008, engineer, composer
Jump5, Greatest Hits, 2008, composer
PureNRG, Here We Go Again, 2008, composer
Gold City, Moment of Truth, 2008, composer
Francesca Battistelli, My Paper Heart, 2008, Vocal Engineer, Vocal Producer, Mixing
Natalie Grant, Natalie Grant Collector's Edition, 2008, composer
The Booth Brothers, Room for More, 2008, arranger, Mixing, Audio Production, Featured Artist, Programming
The Master's Men, Singin' the House Down, 2008, composer
One Heart, Walk out on the Water, 2008, composer
Sevier Heights Celebration, Celebrate, 2007, Choir and Orchestra Composer
Eleventyseven, Galactic Conquest, 2007, producer, engineer
Janet Paschal, Home Again, 2007, engineer
All Star United, Love & Radiation, 2007, producer, engineer, Mixing, Audio Production
Bill Gaither, Love Can Turn the World, 2007, composer
Our Heart's Hero, Our Heart's Hero, 2007, Editing, Vocal Engineer
PureNRG, PureNRG, 2007, composer
Brian Free, Real Faith, 2007, producer, Audio Production, Digital Editing, Vocal Arrangement, Vocal Producer, composer
Talley Trio, Stages, 2007, composer
The Imperials, The Imperials, 2007, composer
Everyday Sunday, Wake Up! Wake Up!, 2007, engineer, Vocal Producer
Krystal Meyers, Dying for a Heart, 2006, Vocal Engineer, Vocal Producer
4Him, Encore... For Future Generations, 2006, engineer
Legacy Five, Live in Music City, 2006, composer
Gold City, Revival, 2006, composer
Talley Trio, Rise Above, 2006, composer
Stellar Kart, We Can't Stand Sitting Down, 2006, producer, engineer, Vocal Engineer
Brian Littrell, Welcome Home, 2006, composer
WOW Next 2007, 2006, composer
Natalie Grant, Awaken, 2005, composer
Krystal Meyers, Krystal Meyers, 2005, engineer, Mixing
The Booth Brothers, The Blind Man Saw It All, 2005, Producer, engineer, Mixing, Programming, composer
Jump5, The Very Best of Jump5, 2005, composer
FFH, Voice from Home, 2005, Mixing, Mastering
The Imperials, It's Still the Cross, 2004, producer
Martin Adu, So You Would Know, 2004, engineer, Mixing
The Imperials, Song of Christmas, 2004, producer, arranger
The Martins, Above It All, 2003, engineer, Vocal Producer
New Spirit, Light of the World, 2003, producer, engineer, Mixing, Mastering
New Spirit, This is the Hour, 2001, composer

References

1961 births
Living people
Record producers from Virginia
People from Alexandria, Virginia